Frederick Neville Shinwell Melland (April 3, 1904 in Manchester – December 7, 1990) was a British ice hockey player who competed in the 1928 Winter Olympics.

In 1928 he finished fourth with the British team in the Olympic tournament.

External links
Frederick Melland's profile at the British Olympic Association

1904 births
1990 deaths
English ice hockey players
Ice hockey players at the 1928 Winter Olympics
Olympic ice hockey players of Great Britain
Sportspeople from Manchester